Frederico Fernando Essenfelder (23 June 1891 – 27 February 1952), also known as Fritz Essenfelder, was an Argentine football player who settled in Brazil. Essenfelder played as a midfielder between 1909 and 1917. He was also the founder of the Coritiba Foot Ball Club, which he established in 1909.

Early life 
Essenfelder was born in Buenos Aires, Argentina, of German origin. His family migrated to Curitiba in 1909 where he joined a team called Clube Ginástico Teuto-Brasileiro.

The football team Fritz created was called the 'Coritiba football club'. Fritz was chosen to be the captain because of his leadership skills.

Essenfelder was the champion of Paraná state, winning Curitiba's first title in 1916.

References 

Coritiba Foot Ball Club
Coritiba Foot Ball Club players
1891 births
1952 deaths
Association football midfielders
Argentine footballers
Footballers from Buenos Aires